Anarchias seychellensis is a moray eel found in coral reefs in the Pacific and Indian Oceans. It was first named by J. L. B. Smith Smith in 1962, and is commonly known as the Seychelles moray or the marbled reef-eel.

Distribution and habitat

References

seychellensis
Fish of the Indian Ocean
Fish of the Pacific Ocean
Fauna of Seychelles
Fish described in 1962